Sid Meier's Antietam! is a real-time computer wargame designed by Sid Meier, the co-founder of Firaxis Games, then released in December 1999. It is the sequel to the 1997 Sid Meier's Gettysburg!.

Gameplay
The game allows the player to control either the Confederate or Union troops during the Battle of Antietam of the American Civil War. It can be played as a single scenario, or as a campaign of linked scenarios, either recounting the original history or exploring alternate possibilities.

Development
The game was not released through retail stores. The staff of Computer Gaming World summarized it as "a grand experiment by Firaxis to test the popularity of online-only distribution for commercial releases."

Reception

Antietam! received "favorable" reviews according to the review aggregation website Metacritic.

The game was a runner-up for Computer Games Strategy Plus 1999 "Wargame of the Year" award. The staff wrote, "Another battle, another victory for this thoroughly entertaining wargame 'for the masses.'" Conversely, the staff of Computer Gaming World named it the best wargame game of 1999. They wrote, "Antietam is the epitome of a Sid Meier design: intensely absorbing and wickedly punishing."

See also 
 Battle of Antietam (video game)

References

External links
 

1999 video games
American Civil War video games
Computer wargames
Firaxis Games games
Multiplayer and single-player video games
Real-time tactics video games
Antietam!
Video game sequels
Video games developed in the United States
Video games set in the United States
Windows games
Windows-only games
Battle of Antietam